Love Marriage is a 1959 Bollywood film directed by Subodh Mukherjee. The film stars Dev Anand and Mala Sinha along with Helen.

Plot
Sunil Kumar (Dev Anand) is a star cricket player in his city of Jhansi and lives with his brother's family. Sunil's sister-in-law Uma and her little son have deep affection for him and maintain that Sunil is the reason for their happy family. Soon, Sunil leaves for Bombay to attend a job interview and there, he rents a room to stay. The landlord's daughter Geeta (Mala Sinha) initially dislikes Sunil, but after watching him play cricket, she falls in love with him. They soon get married and go back to Jhansi to live with Sunil's family. But their harmonious life undergoes problem when Sunil's behavior becomes wayward and everyone starts hating him. What reasons are leading to friction between Sunil and Geeta? Why has Sunil become everyone's object of dislike? What secret is Sunil hiding from the world?

Cast
 Dev Anand as Sonu / Sunil Kumar
 Abhi Bhattacharya as Sonu's brother Anil Kumar
 Pranoti Ghosh as Sonu's bhabhi
 Mala Sinha as Geeta
 Helen (actress) as dancer

Soundtrack

References

External links
 

1959 films
Films scored by Shankar–Jaikishan
1950s Hindi-language films
Films about cricket in India